The Freedom of Speech Award honors persons or organisations for their exceptional contributions to the fight for or in defence of free speech, or creating conditions and supporting efforts promoting freedom of speech.

The winner is selected by all the International Association of Press Clubs member press clubs from over 30 countries. The winner receives a medal of freedom of speech.

Every year laureates are honored at a gala dinner in Warsaw, Poland and given an award.

The first award was given on June, 4th 2013 to organization Reporters Without Borders and the award ceremony was attended by the Nobel Peace Prize winner Lech Wałęsa.

Laureates

This list includes the recipients of the award as recorded at the official IAPC website.
 2022 Cheng Lei, Australia
 2021 Yuliya Slutskaya, Belarus,
 2019 The Washington Post and Fred Ryan, United States
 2018 The Guardian, United Kingdom
 2017 Independent Turkish journalists
 2015 Peter Greste, Mohamed Fahmy and Baher Mohamed, Australia and Egypt
 2014 Aleksey Simonov, Russia
 2013 Reporters Without Borders, France

References

External links

 

Awards established in 2013
Free expression awards
Journalism awards